Bernardino India (1528–1590) was an Italian painter of the late Renaissance, born and mainly active in Verona. He is said to have trained with Domenico Riccio. He collaborated with Michele Sanmicheli in the Canossa palace and Pellegrini chapel in San Bernardino of Verona. He collaborated with Felice Brusasorci, Domenico's son in frescoes at Palazzo Fiorio Della Seta. He decorated Palladian villas such as Villa Pojana, Villa Foscari (also known as La Malcontenta) where Giovanni Battista Zelotti also worked, and the Palazzo Thiene in Vicenza. Orlando Flacco completed his most extensive work for the Sala Maggior di Consiglio in Verona.

References

1528 births
1590 deaths
16th-century Italian painters
Italian male painters
Painters from Verona
Painters from Vicenza
Italian Mannerist painters